Pietro I Candiano ( – 18 September 887) was briefly the sixteenth Doge of Venice in 887.

History
He followed Orso I Participazio and Giovanni II Participazio as Doge of Venice, elected to the throne at the side of the elderly, and beloved, Giovanni circa April 887. He launched a military attempt against the Narentines in Dalmatia, who were hostile to Venetia after 886. As soon as he became Doge, he advanced with a fleet of twelve galleys to the port of Makarska, where he sank five Narentine ships. He landed near Mokro and advanced deeper inland, but the Narentines crushed his forces, killing him in open battle on 18 September 887. He was the first Doge to die in a battle for La Serenissima (Italian for The Most Serene, referring to the Republic of Venice). 

Following his death, the Venetians began to pay prince Branimir of Croatia (879–892) an annual tribute for the right to travel and trade in the Croatian part of the Adriatic; between Pietro's death in 887 and 948, no new war was recorded with the Croats, which is thought to show they paid tribute to maintain the peace. Giovanni briefly ruled Venice until a successor could be found for Candiano. It was Pietro Tribuno, his great-nephew. His son, Pietro II Candiano, also later became Doge.

Sources
Norwich, John Julius. A History of Venice. Alfred A. Knopf: New York, 1982.

References

840s births
887 deaths
9th-century Doges of Venice
Republic of Venice military personnel killed in action
Monarchs killed in action
Candiano family